In mathematics, the greatest common divisor (GCD) of two or more integers, which are not all zero, is the largest positive integer that divides each of the integers. For two integers x, y, the greatest common divisor of x and y is denoted . For example, the GCD of 8 and 12 is 4, that is, .

In the name "greatest common divisor", the adjective "greatest" may be replaced by "highest", and the word "divisor" may be replaced by "factor", so that other names include highest common factor (hcf), etc.  Historically, other names for the same concept have included greatest common measure.

Overview

Definition 

In this case, the GCD is the absolute value of the non zero integer: . This case is important as the terminating step of the Euclidean algorithm.

The above definition cannot be used for defining , since , and zero thus has no greatest divisor. However, zero is its own greatest divisor if greatest is understood in the context of the divisibility relation, so  is commonly defined as 0. This convention is followed by many computer algebra systems. Nonetheless, some authors leave  undefined.

This is commonly proved by using either Euclid's lemma, the fundamental theorem of arithmetic, or the Euclidean algorithm. This is the meaning of "greatest" that is used for the generalizations of the concept of GCD.

Example 

The number 54 can be expressed as a product of two integers in several different ways:
 

The numbers that these two lists have in common are the common divisors of 54 and 24, that is,
 

Of these, the greatest is 6, so it is the greatest common divisor:
 

Computing all divisors of the two numbers in this way is usually not efficient, especially for large numbers that have many divisors.

Coprime numbers 

Two numbers are called relatively prime, or coprime, if their greatest common divisor equals 1. For example, 9 and 28 are coprime.

A geometric view 

For example, a 24-by-60 rectangular area can be divided into a grid of: 1-by-1 squares, 2-by-2 squares, 3-by-3 squares, 4-by-4 squares, 6-by-6 squares or 12-by-12 squares. Therefore, 12 is the greatest common divisor of 24 and 60. A 24-by-60 rectangular area can thus be divided into a grid of 12-by-12 squares, with two squares along one edge (24/12 = 2) and five squares along the other (60/12 = 5).

Applications

Reducing fractions 

The greatest common divisor is useful for reducing fractions to the lowest terms. For example, gcd(42, 56) = 14, therefore,

Least common multiple 

The least common multiple of two integers that are not both zero can be computed from their greatest common divisor, by using the relation

Calculation

Using prime factorizations 
Greatest common divisors can be computed by determining the prime factorizations of the two numbers and comparing factors. For example, to compute gcd(48, 180), we find the prime factorizations 48 = 24 · 31 and 180 = 22 · 32 · 51; the GCD is then 2min(4,2) · 3min(1,2) · 5min(0,1) = 22 · 31 · 50  = 12, as shown in the Venn diagram. The corresponding LCM is then
2max(4,2) · 3max(1,2) · 5max(0,1) = 
24 · 32 · 51  = 720.

In practice, this method is only feasible for small numbers, as computing prime factorizations takes too long.

Euclid's algorithm 

So, Euclid's method for computing the greatest common divisor of two positive integers consists of replacing the larger number by the difference of the numbers, and repeating this until the two numbers are equal: that is their greatest common divisor.

For example, to compute , one proceeds as follows:

So .

This method can be very slow if one number is much larger than the other. So, the variant that follows is generally preferred.

Euclidean algorithm 

For example, to compute gcd(48,18), the computation is as follows:

This again gives .

Lehmer's GCD algorithm 

Lehmer's algorithm is based on the observation that the initial quotients produced by Euclid's algorithm can be determined based on only the first few digits; this is useful for numbers that are larger than a computer word. In essence, one extracts initial digits, typically forming one or two computer words, and runs Euclid's algorithms on these smaller numbers, as long as it is guaranteed that the quotients are the same with those that would be obtained with the original numbers. The quotients are collected into a small 2-by-2 transformation matrix (a matrix of single-word integers) to reduce the original numbers. This process is repeated until numbers are small enough that the binary algorithm (see below) is more efficient.

This algorithm improves speed, because it reduces the number of operations on very large numbers, and can use hardware arithmetic for most operations. In fact, most of the quotients are very small, so a fair number of steps of the Euclidean algorithm can be collected in a 2-by-2 matrix of single-word integers. When Lehmer's algorithm encounters a quotient that is too large, it must fall back to one iteration of Euclidean algorithm, with a Euclidean division of large numbers.

Binary GCD algorithm 

The binary GCD algorithm uses only subtraction and division by 2.
The method is as follows: Let a and b be the two non-negative integers. Let the integer d be 0. There are five possibilities:
 a = b.
As gcd(a, a) = a, the desired GCD is a × 2d (as a and b are changed in the other cases, and d records the number of times that a and b have been both divided by 2 in the next step, the GCD of the initial pair is the product of a and 2d).

 Both a and b are even.
Then 2 is a common divisor. Divide both a and b by 2, increment d by 1 to record the number of times 2 is a common divisor and continue.

 a is even and b is odd.
Then 2 is not a common divisor. Divide a by 2 and continue.

 a is odd and b is even.
Then 2 is not a common divisor. Divide b by 2 and continue.

 Both a and b are odd.
As gcd(a,b) = gcd(b,a), if a < b then exchange a and b. The number c = a − b is positive and smaller than a. Any number that divides a and b must also divide c so every common divisor of a and b is also a common divisor of b and c. Similarly, a = b + c and every common divisor of b and c is also a common divisor of a and b. So the two pairs (a, b)  and (b, c) have the same common divisors, and thus gcd(a,b) = gcd(b,c). Moreover, as a and b are both odd, c is even, the process can be continued with the pair (a, b) replaced by the smaller numbers (c/2, b) without changing the GCD.

Each of the above steps reduces at least one of a and b while leaving them non-negative and so can only be repeated a finite number of times. Thus eventually the process results in a = b, the stopping case. Then the GCD is a × 2d.

Example: (a, b, d) = (48,  18, 0) → (24, 9, 1) → (12, 9, 1) → (6, 9, 1) → (3, 9, 1) → (3, 3, 1) ; the original GCD is thus the product 6 of 2d = 21 and a= b= 3.

The binary GCD algorithm is particularly easy to implement on binary computers. Its computational complexity is

The computational complexity is usually given in terms of the length  of the input.
.

Other methods 

If a and b are both nonzero, the greatest common divisor of a and b can be computed by using least common multiple (LCM) of a and b:

,

but more commonly the LCM is computed from the GCD.

Using Thomae's function f,

which generalizes to a and b rational numbers or commensurable real numbers.

Keith Slavin has shown that for odd a ≥ 1:

which is a function that can be evaluated for complex b. Wolfgang Schramm has shown that

is an entire function in the variable b for all positive integers a where cd(k) is Ramanujan's sum.

Complexity 

The computational complexity of the computation of greatest common divisors has been widely studied. If one uses the Euclidean algorithm and the elementary algorithms for multiplication and division, the computation of the greatest common divisor of two integers of at most  bits is  This means that the computation of greatest common divisor has, up to a constant factor, the same complexity as the multiplication.

However, if a fast multiplication algorithm is used, one may modify the Euclidean algorithm for improving the complexity, but the computation of a greatest common divisor becomes slower than the multiplication.

Previous complexities are valid for the usual models of computation, specifically multitape Turing machines and random-access machines.

The computation of the greatest common divisors  belongs thus to the class of problems solvable in quasilinear time. A fortiori, the corresponding decision problem belongs to the class P of problems solvable in polynomial time. The GCD problem is not known to be in NC, and so there is no known way to parallelize it efficiently; nor is it known to be P-complete, which would imply that it is unlikely to be possible to efficiently parallelize GCD computation. Shallcross et al. showed that a related problem (EUGCD, determining the remainder sequence arising during the Euclidean algorithm) is NC-equivalent to the problem of integer linear programming with two variables; if either problem is in NC or is P-complete, the other is as well. Since NC contains NL, it is also unknown whether a space-efficient algorithm for computing the GCD exists, even for nondeterministic Turing machines.

Although the problem is not known to be in NC, parallel algorithms asymptotically faster than the Euclidean algorithm exist; the fastest known deterministic algorithm is by Chor and Goldreich, which (in the CRCW-PRAM model) can solve the problem in  time with  processors. Randomized algorithms can solve the problem in  time on  processors  (this is superpolynomial).

Properties 
, where a and b are not both zero, may be defined alternatively and equivalently as the smallest positive integer d which can be written in the form , where p and q are integers. This expression is called Bézout's identity. Numbers p and q like this can be computed with the extended Euclidean algorithm.
This is usually used as the base case in the Euclidean algorithm.
If m is a positive integer, then .
If m is any integer, then . Equivalently, .
If m is a positive common divisor of a and b, then .
The GCD is a commutative function: .
The GCD is an associative function: . Thus  can be used to denote the GCD of multiple arguments.
The GCD is a multiplicative function in the following sense: if a1 and a2 are relatively prime, then .
 is closely related to the least common multiple : we have
.
This formula is often used to compute least common multiples: one first computes the GCD with Euclid's algorithm and then divides the product of the given numbers by their GCD.
The following versions of distributivity hold true:

.
.
It is sometimes useful to define  and  because then the natural numbers become a complete distributive lattice with GCD as meet and LCM as join operation. This extension of the definition is also compatible with the generalization for commutative rings given below.
For non-negative integers a and b, where a and b are not both zero, provable by considering the Euclidean algorithm in base n:
.
 An identity involving Euler's totient function:

 where  is the p-adic valuation.

Probabilities and expected value 
In 1972, James E. Nymann showed that k integers, chosen independently and uniformly from {1, ..., n}, are coprime with probability 1/ζ(k) as n goes to infinity, where ζ refers to the Riemann zeta function. (See coprime for a derivation.) This result was extended in 1987 to show that the probability that k random integers have greatest common divisor d is d−k/ζ(k).

Using this information, the expected value of the greatest common divisor function can be seen (informally) to not exist when k = 2. In this case the probability that the GCD equals d is d−2/ζ(2), and since ζ(2) = π2/6 we have

 

This last summation is the harmonic series, which diverges. However, when k ≥ 3, the expected value is well-defined, and by the above argument, it is

 

For k = 3, this is approximately equal to 1.3684. For k = 4, it is approximately 1.1106.

In commutative rings 

The notion of greatest common divisor can more generally be defined for elements of an arbitrary commutative ring, although in general there need not exist one for every pair of elements.

With this definition, two elements  and  may very well have several greatest common divisors, or none at all. Existence of a GCD is not assured in arbitrary integral domains. However, if  is a unique factorization domain, then any two elements have a GCD, and more generally this is true in GCD domains.
If  is a Euclidean domain in which euclidean division is given algorithmically (as is the case for instance when R = F[X] where  is a field, or when  is the ring of Gaussian integers), then greatest common divisors can be computed using a form of the Euclidean algorithm based on the division procedure.

The following is an example of an integral domain with two elements that do not have a GCD:

Corresponding to the Bézout property we may, in any commutative ring, consider the collection of elements of the form pa + qb, where  and  range over the ring. (Indeed, Ernst Kummer used this ideal as a replacement for a GCD in his treatment of Fermat's Last Theorem, although he envisioned it as the set of multiples of some hypothetical, or ideal, ring element , whence the ring-theoretic term.)

See also 
 Bézout domain
 Lowest common denominator
 Unitary divisor

Notes

References

Further reading 

 Donald Knuth. The Art of Computer Programming, Volume 2: Seminumerical Algorithms, Third Edition. Addison-Wesley, 1997. . Section 4.5.2: The Greatest Common Divisor, pp. 333–356.
 Thomas H. Cormen, Charles E. Leiserson, Ronald L. Rivest, and Clifford Stein. Introduction to Algorithms, Second Edition. MIT Press and McGraw-Hill, 2001. . Section 31.2: Greatest common divisor, pp. 856–862.
 Saunders Mac Lane and Garrett Birkhoff. A Survey of Modern Algebra, Fourth Edition. MacMillan Publishing Co., 1977. . 1–7: "The Euclidean Algorithm."

Multiplicative functions
Articles containing video clips